The Minister of Cultura is the head of the Ministry of Culture. The minister serves as the principal advisor to the president of Colombia, and the national government, on policies, programs, and activities related to all culture in Colombia. As a member of the Cabinet of Colombia, the Minister is sixteenth in the line of succession to the presidency.

Funtions and duties
The Minister of Culture leads the formulation of the integral policy of the creative economy in the National Government and develops programs and projects in the terms indicated in the law.

The Ministry of Culture is responsible for leading the intersectoral coordination process to strengthen public, private and mixed institutions, aimed at the promotion, defense, dissemination and development of cultural and creative activities and adequately promote the potential of the cultural and creative economy.

List of Ministers of Culture

References

Culture